Pentadecylic acid, also known as pentadecanoic acid or C15:0 is an odd-chain saturated fatty acid.  It is a colorless solid.

A laboratory preparation involves permanganate oxidation of 1-hexadecene.

Pentadecylic acid is found primarily in dairy fat, as well as in ruminant meat and some types of fish and plants. It is one of the most common odd-chain fatty acids, although it is rare in nature, comprising 1.2% of milk fat from cows. The butterfat in cows milk is its major dietary source
and it is used as a marker for butterfat consumption. Pentadecylic acid also occurs in hydrogenated mutton fat.  Higher circulating concentrations of C15:0 have been associated with a lower risk of developing type 2 diabetes and cardiovascular disease. Higher C15:0 concentrations have also been linked to a lower risk of chronic inflammation, adiposity, metabolic syndrome, nonalcoholic steatohepatitis, chronic obstructive pulmonary disease, Alzheimer's disease, and cancer. C15:0 has been shown to repair mitochondrial function and activate peroxisome proliferator-activated receptors alpha and delta. In human cell systems and animal models, C15:0 has also been shown to decrease inflammation, and decrease the severity of anemia, dyslipidemia, and fibrosis. C15:0 has been proposed as an essential fatty acid due to the following: 1) C15:0 is not readily made endogenously, 2) lower C15:0 dietary intake and blood concentrations are associated with higher mortality and a poorer physiological state, and 3) C15:0 has demonstrated activities and efficacy that parallel associated health benefits in humans.

See also 
 List of saturated fatty acids
 List of carboxylic acids
 Margaric acid

References

External links 
Safety data

Fatty acids
Alkanoic acids